Bundjalung may refer to:
 Bundjalung people,  an Aboriginal-Australian group
 Western Bundjalung people, an Aboriginal-Australian group
 Wahlubal, their language
 Yugambeh-Bandjalangic peoples, a cultural bloc / polity of Aboriginal-Australians.
 Yugambeh-Bundjalung languages, their language family

Language and nationality disambiguation pages